Hovea magnibractea, is a species of flowering plant in the family Fabaceae and is endemic to south-eastern Australia. It is a shrub with narrowly oblong to lorate (strap-shaped) leaves, and mauve and yellow, pea-like flowers.

Description
Flowering occurs from September to December and the fruit is a sessile pod.

Taxonomy and naming
Hovea magnibractea was first formally described in 2001 by Ian R. Thompson in Australian Systematic Botany from specimens collected by James Henderson Ross near the summit of Mount Elizabeth in 1986.

Distribution and habitat
This species of pea grows on steep, rocky slopes and near scree slopes in montane forest, and is restricted to a few mountains in eastern Victoria. There are also onld records from Tasmania.

References

magnibractea
Flora of Queensland
Flora of Victoria (Australia)
Flora of Tasmania
Fabales of Australia
Plants described in 2001